John George Pipkin is an American author, born in Baltimore, Maryland in 1967. He holds a PhD in British Romantic Literature from Rice University in Houston, TX, an MA in English from UNC-Chapel Hill, and a BA from Washington & Lee University in Lexington, VA. His first novel, Woodsburner, won the Center for Fiction First Novel Prize, the Massachusetts Center for the Book Fiction Prize, and the Texas Institute of Letters Steven Turner Award.

Woodsburner is a historical novel that revolves around a little-known event in the life of Henry David Thoreau: in 1844, Thoreau accidentally set fire to 300 acres of woods around Concord, Massachusetts, and Pipkin imagines the impact of that fire upon Thoreau, as well as three other characters, whose fictional stories are interwoven with the philosopher's. The book was well-reviewed by a variety of critics, including Brenda Wineapple in The New York Times and Ron Charles in The Washington Post.

In 2010, he was named writer-in-residence at Southwestern University, and was awarded the Dobie Paisano Fellowship from the Texas Institute of Letters. He teaches writing at the University of Texas at Austin, and in Spalding University's Low-Residency MFA Program.

Pipkin's second historical novel, The Blind Astronomer's Daughter, was published by Bloomsbury US in October 2016. This novel is set in Romantic-era Ireland and England, and centers on William Herschel's discovery of Uranus and the resulting impact on culture and society.

Pipkin has been awarded a 2016 MacDowell Colony (New Hampshire) Residential Fellowship for ongoing work on his third novel.

References

1967 births
21st-century American novelists
American male novelists
Writers from Baltimore
Rice University alumni
Living people
American historical novelists
21st-century American male writers
Novelists from Maryland